Kurre may refer to:
 Dayaldas Kurre, an Indian politician from Madhya Pradesh
 Kurre Jehanabad, a village in Bihar, India
 Kurre Lansburgh (born 1977), a Swedish freestyle skier